The Weakest Link is the Irish version of the quiz show, The Weakest Link.

The show was broadcast on TV3 from 2001 and was presented by Eamon Dunphy. It is one of the few times that an international version of the show has been hosted by a man. The producers of the series used the euro as the banking currency. This had the effect of reducing the prize fund as the Irish pound was still in full circulation at the time and the euro would not be issued until January 2002.

Money tree

2001 Irish television series debuts
2002 Irish television series endings
Irish quiz shows
Irish television series based on British television series
Irish television series based on non-Irish television series
Virgin Media Television (Ireland) original programming
Ireland